The 2002 Pacific Life Open was a tennis tournament played on outdoor hard courts. It was the 29th edition of the Indian Wells Masters and was part of the Tennis Masters Series of the 2002 ATP Tour and of Tier I of the 2002 WTA Tour. Both the men's and women's events took place at the Indian Wells Tennis Garden in Indian Wells, California in the United States from March 6 through March 17, 2002.

Finals

Men's singles

 Lleyton Hewitt defeated  Tim Henman 6–1, 6–2
 It was Hewitt's 2nd singles title of the year and the 14th of his career. It was his 1st Masters title.

Women's singles

 Daniela Hantuchová defeated  Martina Hingis 6–3, 6–4
 It was Hantuchová's 1st title career title. Hantuchová was the lowest-ranked player ever to win the title.

Men's doubles

 Mark Knowles /  Daniel Nestor defeated  Roger Federer /  Max Mirnyi 6–4, 6–4
 It was Knowles' 3rd title of the year and the 20th of his career. It was Nestor's 3rd title of the year and the 23rd of his career.

Women's doubles

 Lisa Raymond /  Rennae Stubbs defeated  Elena Dementieva /  Janette Husárová 7–5, 6–0
 It was Raymond's 5th title of the year and the 35th of her career. It was Stubbs' 4th title of the year and the 37th of her career.

References

External links

 Association of Tennis Professionals (ATP) tournament profile
 WTA Tournament Profile

 
Pacific Life Open
Pacific Life Open
2002
Pacific Life Open
Pacific Life Open
Pacific Life Open